Ten Days or 10 Days may refer to:

Music
"Ten Days", a 2002 song by Celine Dion from A New Day Has Come
"Ten Days" (Missy Higgins song), a 2004 song by Missy Higgins

Military history
Ten Days' Campaign, Dutch attempt to repress Belgian Revolution 1831
Ten-Day War, following Slovenian declaration of independence 1991
 Ten Crucial Days, of the American Revolution, the battles of Trenton and Princeton, from December 25, 1776, to January 3, 1777

See also
 Ten More Days
 Ten Tragic Days
 10,000 Days (disambiguation)